International Society for Developmental Psychobiology (ISDP) promotes research on the behavioral development on all species including humans. It is an international-nonprofit organization.  Its official scientific journal is Developmental Psychobiology published by John Wiley & Sons.  It conducts annual meetings during which research on developmental psychobiology is presented and abstracts are published in Developmental Psychobiology.

References

External links
ISDP Official Website
 Developmental Psychobiology, Official journal of ISDP

Health care-related professional associations based in the United States
Developmental biology
Psychology organizations based in the United States